Demushkin, Dyemushkin or Dyomushkin may refer to
Demushkin group in mathematical group theory
Dmitry Demushkin (born 1979), Russian politician and public figure